Cathedral: The Story of its Construction is an illustrated book by David Macaulay.   Published in 1973 by Houghton Mifflin, it was the author's first book.

Cathedral tells the story of the construction of a great medieval cathedral using pen-and-ink drawings.  It won the 1975 Deutscher Jugendliteraturpreis for children's non-fiction.

Teaching resources based on the book

 Cathedral: The Story of Its Construction by David Macaulay

PBS documentary
hour-long PBS special on Mccaulay's Cathedral
NPR interview inside the National Cathedral

References

1973 children's books
Architecture books
History of cathedrals